Order of the National Hero (Order of the People's Hero) was a Yugoslav gallantry medal.

The Order of the National Hero also refers to the highest honour for merit in many Commonwealth Caribbean countries:
 Order of the National Hero (Antigua and Barbuda)
 Order of National Hero (Bahamas)
 Order of National Heroes (Barbados)
 Order of the National Hero (Belize)
 Order of the National Hero (Grenada)
 Order of National Hero (Jamaica)
 Order of the National Hero (Saint Kitts and Nevis)

It furthermore may refer to:

 Order of National Hero (Georgia)